Zare Markovski (born October 28, 1960, in Skopje) is a Macedonian former professional basketball player and current assistant coach of Dinamo Sassari of the Italian Lega Basket Serie A (LBA), and head coach of the Romanian national basketball team.

Career
Zare Markovski as player played in KK Rabotnički and MZT Skopje. His career as a player was short. At the age of 23 he started working with the youth in KK Rabotnički. Later in 1988 he was named as head coach of the same team.

Clubs

Playing career
MZT Skopje
KK Rabotnički

Head coaching career with national teams
1997–1999: Macedonia national basketball team

National domestic league championships
1990-91:   Rabotnicki Skopje: Yugoslav League, Promotion
1999–00: Lugano Tigers:   Switzerland League, Winner
2000-01    Lugano Tigers  :   Euroleague, Member
2000–01: Lugano Tigers:   Switzerland League, Winner
2001–02: Lugano Tigers:   Switzerland League, Winner
2006-07:   Virtus Bologna :   Italian League, Runner-Up
2008-09:   S.S. Felice Scandone: Euroleague, Member

National domestic cup championships
2001-02:   Lugano Tigers:  Switzerland Cup, Winner
2002-03:   Lugano Tigers:  Switzerland Cup, Winner
1997-98:   Orka:           Macedonian Cup, Runner-Up
2006-07:   Virtus Bologna: Italian Cup, Runner-Up
2010-11:   Limoges CSP:    French Cup, Runner-Up

References

External links
http://web.legabasket.it/coach/MAR-ZAR/zare_markovski
http://www.gazzetta.it/Basket/SerieA/11-11-2014/basket-serie-a-caserta-arriva-markovski-901009876756.shtml

1960 births
Living people
Sportspeople from Skopje
Limoges CSP coaches
Macedonian basketball coaches
Macedonian expatriate sportspeople in Italy
Macedonian expatriate basketball people in Turkey
Macedonian expatriate sportspeople in Romania
Pallacanestro Reggiana coaches
Reyer Venezia coaches
Virtus Bologna coaches
Dinamo Sassari coaches